Trauma Records was a Los Angeles-based independent record label created in 1993 by Paul Palmer and Rob Kahane.

Trauma Records had a joint venture agreement with Interscope Records that included financing and distribution through Interscope Records. Trauma signed and developed bands such as Bush, No Doubt, Phunk Junkeez, and The Flys. In 1997, Trauma sued Interscope for $100 million when Interscope laid claim to No Doubt's contract, which Trauma asserted had been transferred to Trauma in 1995. The suit was settled out of court, allowing Trauma to retain the group's recording rights and obtain $3 to $5 million in cash. Trauma's Bush catalogue was transferred to Kirtland Records in 2005. 

Trauma Records was the label under which NBA superstar Shaquille O'Neal released his hip-hop albums, however his most anticipated album, Shaquille O'Neal Presents His Superfriends, Vol. 1 was never released. It also released several soundtracks to popular films starring Mary-Kate and Ashley Olsen such as Holiday in the Sun and When in Rome. 

In 2004 Trauma Records became a subsidiary of Interscope Records, and is currently inactive with no website or current address.  Interscope has all but phased out the label following its decline in management and sales. 

The label has been reactivated as Trauma2 Records, however their website has been off-line since September 2018. 

Kahane now manages Bush, whom he signed to the original label.

See also
 List of record labels

References

American independent record labels
Alternative rock record labels
Record labels established in 1993